"Last Time" is a song by the American rock band Fuel originally released on their 2000 album Something Like Human as the lead track.

Written by guitarist Carl Bell, "Last Time" was released as a single and reached No. 21 on the Billboard Mainstream Rock chart.

"Last Time" is generally the opening song performed at their concerts.

Track listing
All songs by Carl Bell except where noted.

"Last Time" 3:40

Charts

References

2001 singles
Fuel (band) songs
2000 songs
Songs written by Carl Bell (musician)
Epic Records singles